This list of dental colleges in South Korea include all 10 colleges of Dentistry and 3 dentistry graduate schools in South Korea which are established for dentist training. They are recognised by the D.D.S. and a dental degree from a South Korean university.
There are 8 colleges in Seoul; 1 college at Gangwon Province, 1 at South Chungcheong Province, 2 at Gwangju, 2 at North Jeolla Province, 1 at South Gyeongsang Province and 1 in Deagu.

Seoul

Gangwon Province

South Chungcheong Province

Gwangju

North Jeolla Province

South Gyeongsang Province

Daegu

See also 
 List of universities and colleges in South Korea

References 

South Korea